Tomah is the name of places in the US state of Wisconsin:

Tomah, Wisconsin, city
Tomah (town), Wisconsin, town
Tomah (Amtrak station), an Amtrak station in Tomah, Wisconsin